Jack Majgaard Jensen (born 25 March 1973 is a Danish football manager who currently manages FC Roskilde. He has previously managed Lunds BK, Lyngby BK, FC Rosengård (women), and Landskrona BoIS.

References

1973 births
Living people
Danish football managers
Landskrona BoIS managers
Lunds BK managers
Lyngby Boldklub managers
Danish 1st Division managers